The Singing Americans were a Southern Gospel group based in Maiden, North Carolina.  They are best known for being a stepping stone to popular singers, such as Mark Flaker (Florida Boys) Ivan Parker (Gold City), Danny Funderburk (the Cathedrals), Clayton Inman (Kingdom Heirs, Won By One, and Triumphant Quartet), David Sutton (Kingdom Heirs and Triumphant Quartet), Michael English (Gaither Vocal Band), Mark Fain (Gold City and Ricky Skaggs & Kentucky Thunder), Taylor Barnes (Gold City), and Jeff Easter (Jeff and Sheri Easter). The group was popular throughout the 1980s and early 1990s.

History
The Singing Americans were started in 1968 in Winston-Salem, North Carolina (by Lemar and Sims) and was owned by Homer Wadford. In 1973 when the Oak Ridge Boys were beginning to make their transition from gospel to country, The Singing Americans were signed by the prestigious Lou Wills Hildreth Agency in Nashville.  In an article announcing the signing, The Singing News predicted that based on their sound and popularity, that The Singing Americans would take the Oak Ridge Boys spot as the number one quartet in gospel music. Unfortunately, their owner, Homer Wadford had a different sound in mind, and wanted to see the group move in a different direction stylistically. In 1980, the group was sold to Charles Burke, who later went on to own the Kingsmen Quartet name for a few years, and obtained all new personnel with Mark Flaker singing tenor, Charles Surratt singing baritone, Ed Crawford singing Lead, and Charles Burke's son, Dwayne, singing bass. Mark Flaker left later that year and was replaced by Danny Funderburk. Ed Crwaford left and was replaced by Michael English, who would leave for a couple years and be replaced by Ivan Parker, and then Clayton Inman. Also, in 1982, Surrat would leave and be replaced by Southern Gospel legend, Ed Hill. When Michael English left for the second time in 1985, he was replaced again by Clayton Inman, who would replace Hill in 1987 in the baritone spot, leaving the lead open for Scott Whitener. The 1990s started a decline in the popularity of the Singing Americans, but it did not mean they still weren't capable of producing popular singers. David Sutton and Taylor Barnes passed through the group during this time. Finally, in 1993, the Singing Americans produced their final album, "Live from Chicago", before retiring in 1994. In August 1996, promoter/historian Charles Waller reunited English with Ed Hill, Rick Strickland, Dwayne Burke and Milton Smith as the Singing Americans, before an audience of over 4,000 gospel music fans at the Grand Ole Gospel Reunion. and in 2010 at the National Quartet Convention in Louisville, KY at a showcase commemorating the 100th anniversary of Southern Gospel music.

Members

Line-ups

Tenor
 Bob Sims (1968-1971)
 Rodney Hoots (1972-197?)
 Mark Flaker (1980)
 Danny Funderburk (1980-1983)
 Rick Strickland (1984-1986)
 Phil Barker (1986-1988)
 Greg Shockley (1988-1990)
 David Walker (1990-1992)
 David Sutton (1992-1994)
 Greg Bentley (1994)

Lead
 Preston Yates (1968-1971)
 Bob Lemar (1972-1974) (moved from baritone; also played piano and managed)
 Glenn Dye (1973-1974) (swapped lead parts with Lemar)
 Ed Crawford (1979-1981)
 Michael English (1981-1982, 1983-1985)
 Ivan Parker (1982-1983)
 Clayton Inman (1983, 1985-1987) (moved to baritone)
 Scott Whitener (1987-1992)
 Dale Forbes (1992-1994)
 David Hill (1994)
 Loren Harris (1994)

Baritone
 Bob Lemar (1968-1971) (moved to lead; also played piano and managed)
 Mickey Blackwelder (1972-1974)
 Wayne Maynard (1974-1979)
 Charles Surratt (1980-1981)
 Ed Hill (1981-1987) (Surratt and Mike Lefevre filled in for Hill several months after he was injured in a bus wreck.)
 Clayton Inman (1987-1989) (moved from lead)
 David Jenkins (1989-1990)
 David Harvell (1990-1992)
 Buddy Burton (1992-1994)

Bass
 Norris Rife (1968-1971)
 Rick Lott (1971-1972)
 Danny Gallimore (1972-1973)
 Hovie Walker (1973-197?)
 Jerry Brown (197?-19??)
 Dwayne Burke (1980-1990)
 Larry Stewart (1990–94)

Piano
 Bob Lemar (1968-1972) (piano, also sang lead)
 Joel Harris (1972-1973)
 Jimmy Taylor (1973-1974)
 Jerry Hatley (1981-1983)
 Martin Gureasko (1983-1985)
 Milton Smith (1985-1986)
 Phil Huffman (1986-1987)
 James Rainey (1987-1990)
 Keith Denson (1990-1992)
 Jerry Kelso (1992)
 Joe Lane (1992-1993, 1993–94)
 Randy Matthews (1993)
 Chuck Trivett (1994)

Bass Guitar
 Euclid Huella (1968-1971)
 Tony Buttler (1971)
 Jeff Easter (198?-1987)
 Mark Fain (1987-1988)
 Taylor Barnes (1988-1993)
 Jason Clark (1993–94)

Rhythm and Lead Guitar
 Harvey Blackwelder (????-????)

Drums
 Jon Mark Russell (19??-197?)

Trumpet
 Jerry Hill (1972-????)
 Gary Barnhart (1972-????)

Musicians Unknown Positions
 Benny Goins (????-????)
 Jason Clark (????-????)
 Roger Fortner (????-????)
 Rory Rigdon (????-????)

Discography

1973-Our Tribute To God And Country
1975-Wanted Live
1977-The Singing Americans
1980-Tell the Angels
1981-The Exciting Sounds of the Singing Americans
1981-Hymntime
1981-Gospel Favorites Vol. 2
1982-Sensational Singing Americans
1982-Sing Gospel Hits Volume 1
1982-Sing Gospel Hits Volume 2
1982-Sing Gospel Hits Volume 3
1982-Sing Gospel Hits Volume 4
1983-Everybody Ought to Praise His Name
1984-Gospel Favorites
1984-Something Old, Something New
1984-Live and Alive
1985-Black and White
1986-Hearts of Praise, Songs of Majesty
1987-Homecoming Live
1988-Chartbreakers
1988-Sing Out
1988-We're Blessed
1989-Angels on Board
1989-Songs We Salute
1990-Watch & Pray
1990-Greatest Hits: 10th Anniversary Collection (Compilation)
1991-Live & Well
1991-Revival
1992-On Stage
1993-Live from Chicago
1993-Golden Hits
1993-Song of Praise
1994-Sing the Old Songs
1996-20 Favorites By The Singing Americans (Compilation)
199?-The Devil Don't Want Us to Have a Revival
199?-Singing Americans Featuring Buddy Burton
199?-Singing For America (Compilation)

Top 20 Songs:
 
Something New
Home
Over There
People Need The Lord
Lamb Of Glory
Black And White
Welcome To Heaven
God Is Greater
They Can't Take That Away
I'd Still Want To Go
I Want To Make Heaven My Home
More Than Enough
Love M.I.A.
Leaning On The Rock
Bridegroom Cometh
Put Your Dreams Where Your Heart Is
Jesus Got A Hold Of Me
Past to Presence
After A While
God Be With You Till We Meet Again

American gospel musical groups
Gospel quartets
Musical groups from North Carolina
Musical groups established in 1968
Southern gospel performers